John Simpson (born August 19, 1997) is an American football offensive guard for the Baltimore Ravens of the National Football League (NFL). He played college football at Clemson.

Early life and high school
Simpson grew up in the Dorchester-Waylyn neighborhood of North Charleston, South Carolina, where he and his younger brother were raised in a single parent household by his mother, and attended Fort Dorchester High School. Rated a four star prospect, Simpson committed to play college football at Clemson over offers from Florida, LSU, South Carolina and Alabama.

College career
Simpson played in nine games (160 total snaps) as a true freshman on Clemson's 2016 National Championship team, missing multiple weeks due to a foot injury. He appeared in 12 games as a sophomore, playing 300 total snaps of the bench as a key reserve on the Tigers' offensive line. Simpson was named the Tigers' starting left guard going into his junior season. Simpson started all 15 games for the Tigers, playing a total of 858 snaps, as the team won the 2019 College Football Playoff National Championship was named third-team All-Atlantic Coast Conference (ACC) and to the second-team by the Associated Press.

Simpson was chosen by head coach Dabo Swinney to represent Clemson at the ACC's 2019 media day. He gained national coverage by a wearing a blonde wig to imitate the team's starting quarterback, Trevor Lawrence, whom most members of the media had expected to be Clemson's player representative. He was named preseason first-team All-ACC and to the Outland Trophy watchlist entering the season. He was also listed as the second-best offensive guard prospect for the 2020 NFL Draft by ESPN analyst Mel Kiper. Simpson was named a first-team midseason All-American by the Associated Press. Simpson was the only offensive guard to be named a consensus first-team All-American for the 2019 season.

Professional career

Las Vegas Raiders
Simpson was selected by the Las Vegas Raiders in the fourth round, 109th overall, of the 2020 NFL Draft. Simpson made his debut on Monday Night Football against the New Orleans Saints on September 21, 2020, entering the game at left guard in the second quarter to replace starter Richie Incognito after he suffered an injury and playing the remainder of the game. He made his first career start the following week on September 27, 2020, against the New England Patriots.

On December 10, 2022, Simpson was waived.

Baltimore Ravens
On December 19, 2022, Simpson was signed to the Baltimore Ravens practice squad. He signed a reserve/future contract on January 16, 2023.

References

External links 
 Clemson Tigers bio
 Las Vegas Raiders bio

1997 births
Living people
People from North Charleston, South Carolina
Players of American football from South Carolina
American football offensive guards
Clemson Tigers football players
All-American college football players
Las Vegas Raiders players
[[Category:Baltimore Ravens